This is a list of diplomatic missions to the Sahrawi Arab Democratic Republic (SADR). The Sahrawi Arab Democratic Republic's government in exile, led by the Polisario Front and headquartered at Camp Rabouni, Algeria, . Some of these states have missions officially accredited to the SADR. As Morocco controls most of the territory claimed by the Sahrawi Republic and amidst the disputed political status of Western Sahara, no embassy is based in Western Sahara, but in neighbouring countries.

Non-resident embassies 
 (Algiers)
 (Addis Ababa)
 (Algiers)
 (New York City)
 (Rome) 
 (Algiers)
 (Algiers) 
 (Kuwait City)
 (New York City) 
 (Algiers)
 (New York City)
 (Algiers)
 (Algiers)
 (Tripoli)
 (Algiers)
 (Algiers)
 (Algiers)

See also 
 Foreign relations of the Sahrawi Arab Democratic Republic
 List of diplomatic missions of the Sahrawi Arab Democratic Republic

Notes

References 

Missions To
Sahrawi Arab Democratic Republic
Western Sahara-related lists
Lists of organizations based in Western Sahara
Lists of organisations based in the Sahrawi Arab Democratic Republic